is a former Japanese football player. He is the current assistant coach of Thai League 2 club Chiangmai.

Club career
Kato was born on January 22, 1953. After graduating from Kwansei Gakuin University, he joined Mitsubishi Motors in 1976. In 1978, the club won all three major title in Japan: the Japan Soccer League, the JSL Cup, and the Emperor's Cup. The club also won the 1980 Emperor's Cup, the 1981 JSL Cup, the and 1982 Japan Soccer League. He retired in 1983. He played 61 games and scored 7 goals in the league.

National team career
On August 23, 1979, Kato debuted for Japan national team against North Korea.

Club statistics

National team statistics

References

External links
 
 Japan National Football Team Database

1953 births
Living people
Kwansei Gakuin University alumni
Japanese footballers
Japan international footballers
Japan Soccer League players
Urawa Red Diamonds players
Association football midfielders